Albert Wood may refer to:
Albert Wood (rugby union), rugby union footballer who played in the 1880s
Albert Wood (footballer) (1903–1965), English footballer
Albert Beaumont Wood (1890–1964), British physicist
A. Baldwin Wood (1879–1956), American inventor and engineer
Albert E. Wood (1870s–1941), British barrister, active in Ireland

See also
Albert Woods (1816–1904), English officer of arms
Albert H. Woods (1870–1951), American theatrical producer